is a Japanese content production and development enterprise, owned by SKY Perfect Communications, established on July 29, 2004. It is involved in the production, development and distribution of several feature films, anime series, television programs and numerous other media. It is presided by Jun'ichi Watanabe, and headquartered in Tokyo, Japan.

Productions

Anime
Witchblade
Kamisama Kazoku
Gyagu Manga Biyori
Ginga Densetsu Weed
Jigoku Shōjo
Jyu Oh Sei
Bokura ga Ita
Mamotte! Lollipop
Mushishi
Hataraki Man
Nodame Cantabile
Blue Dragon
Deltora Quest
Re-Born
Terra e...
Damekko Dōbutsu
Romeo x Juliet

Films
 Hang Ryū Cinema Festival
 Ichiban Kirei na Mizu
 Koala Kachō
 Kōshōnin: Mashita Masayoshi (a.k.a. The Negotiator)
 Kokkuri-san
 Saishū Heiki Kanojo
 Tenshi no Tamago
 Tokyo Friends the Movie
 Transamerica
 Black Jack: Futari no Kuroi Isha
 Brave Story
 Yawarakai Seikatsu
 Yōgisha: Muroi Shinji (a.k.a. The Suspect)
 Sim Sons
 Prince of Tennis
 Mizuchi
 Seishun Manga: Bokura no Renai Scenario
 Oyayubi Sagashi
 Deguchi no Nai Umi
 Duradeka
 Tada-kun wo Aishiteru
 Niji no Megami (a.k.a. Rainbow Song)
 36 Quai des Orfèvres (as Aruiwa Uragiri Toiuna no Inu)
 Meiken Lassie
 Shikyū no Kioku'''
 Suteki na Yoru, Boku ni Kudasai Ashita no Watashi no Tsukurikata Taitei no Ken Some Kind of Wonderful (as Koishikute)
 Gegege no Onitarō Shaberedomo Shaberedomo Ahiru to Kamo no Koinrokkā Burijji Kappa no Kū to Natsuyasumi Litre DJ Heat Island Jigyaku no Uta KurōbiDramaAstro KyūdanMagazinesWorld Soccer King''

References

Anime companies
Entertainment companies of Japan
Mass media companies based in Tokyo
Film distributors of Japan
Magazine publishing companies of Japan
Book publishing companies of Japan
Mass media companies established in 2004
Japanese companies established in 2004